Mogapinyana is a village in Central District of Botswana. The village is located 60 km north-east of Palapye and the population was 1,433 in 2001 census.

References

Populated places in Central District (Botswana)
Villages in Botswana